Heaven Tonight may refer to:

"Heaven Tonight" (Cheap Trick song), 1978 song by Cheap Trick from the album Heaven Tonight
"Heaven Tonight" (Yngwie Malmsteen song), 1988 song by Yngwie Malmsteen from the album Odyssey